Aggregation-induced emission (AIE) is a phenomenon that is observed with certain organic luminophores (fluorescent dyes).

The photoemission efficiencies of most organic compounds is higher in solution than in the solid state.  Photoemission from some organic compounds follows the reverse pattern, being greater in the solid than in solution.  The effect is attributed to the decreased flexibility in the solid.

Aggregation-induced emission enhancement
The phenomenon in which organic luminophores show higher photoluminescence efficiency in the aggregated state than in solution is called aggregation-induced emission enhancement (AIEE). Some luminophores, e.g., diketopyrrolopyrrole-based and sulfonamide-based luminophores, only display enhanced emission upon entering the crystalline state. That is, these luminophores are said to exhibit crystallization-induced emission enhancement (CIEE).
Luminophores such as noble metallic nanoclusters show higher
photoluminescence efficiency in the aggregated state than homogenous
dispersion in solution. This phenomenon is known as
Aggregation-Induced Emission (AIE).

Aggregation-induced emission polymer
Fluorescence-emission Polymer is a kind of polymer which can absorb light of certain frequency and then give out light. These polymers can be applied in biomaterial area. Due to their high biocapacity and fluorescence, they can help researchers to find and mark the location of proteins. And polymers with property of aggregation-induced emission can also help to protect the healthy tissues from the harm of the medicines.

References

Luminescence
Materials
Organic chemistry
Spectroscopy